Bezalel ben Abraham Ashkenazi ( 1520 –  1592) was a rabbi and talmudist who lived in Ottoman Israel during the 16th century. He is best known as the author of the Shitah Mekubetzet, a commentary on the Talmud. Among his disciples were Isaac Luria and Solomon Adeni.

Biography 
Ashkenazi was one of the leading Oriental Talmudists and rabbis of his day. He was probably born in Palestine. Descended from a family of German scholars, most of his life was spent in Egypt where he received his Talmudic education from David ben Solomon ibn Abi Zimra and Israel de Curial. During the lifetime of his teachers, Ashkenazi was regarded as one of the highest authorities in the Orient, and counted Isaac Luria and Solomon Adeni among his pupils. In Egypt his reputation was such that he could abrogate the dignity of the nagid, which had existed for centuries and had gradually deteriorated into an arbitrary aristocratic privilege. When, in 1587, a dispute occurred in Jerusalem over the extent to which scholars not engaged in business should contribute to the taxes paid by the Jewish community to the pasha, Ashkenazi, together with several other rabbis, took the stand that Jewish scholars, being usually impelled by love alone to emigrate to Palestine, and being scarcely able to support themselves, should be relieved from all taxes.

In the same year, Ashkenazi traveled to Palestine settling in Jerusalem, where he was recognized as important by both the Sephardim and the Ashkenazim communities. The conditions in Jerusalem were at this time very critical; and it was mainly due to Ashkenazi's influence that the congregations of the city were not dissolved. German Jews, who normally did not recognize the jurisdiction of the Sephardim, and who, being largely scholars, refused to pay the Jews' tax, nevertheless recognised Ashkenazi's authority.  However this arrangement between the Ashkenazim and the Sephardim seems to have been solely due to the personal influence of Ashkenazi; asvit ended immediately after his death.

Shitah Mekubezet 
Ashkenazi is known principally as the author of Shitah Mekubezet (Hebrew שיטה מקובצת, Gathered Interpretation). This work, as its title indicates, is a collection of glosses on the greater part of the Talmud, in the style of the Tosafot, including much original and foreign material. The great value of the Shitah lies principally in the fact that it contains numerous excerpts from Talmudic commentaries which have not otherwise been preserved.

Ashkenazi himself wrote only short marginal annotations in his edition of the Talmud. Solomon Adeni, his student, edited the annotations into the commentary to Kodashim as it exists today (both versions), including a vast quantity of original material.

Shitah Mekubezet contains expositions of the Talmud taken from the works of the Spaniards Nahmanides, ben Adret, and Yom-Tov of Seville, and from those of the Frenchmen Abraham ben David, Baruch ben Samuel, Isaac of Chinon, etc. The study of the Shitah is particularly valuable for understanding the Tosafists, because the work contains some of the older and unedited Tosafot; besides, glosses of R. Asher ben Jehiel and of the disciples of R. Perez are partly contained in it.

Other works
Ashkenazi is also the author of a collection of responsa, which appeared after his death (Venice, 1595).

His Methodology of the Talmud, and his marginal notes to the Yerushalmi, which were still extant at the time of Azulai, are preserved in manuscript at Jerusalem.

References 

 Its bibliography: Chaim Azulai, Shem ha-Gedolim, ed. Benjacob, i.36; David Conforte, Kore ha-Dorot (see index in Cassel ed.); Frumkin, Eben Shemuel, pp. 67 et seq., 125 et seq., Vilna, 1874; Michael, Or ha-Chaim, No. 612; Luncz, in Jerusalem, ii.23-27; Responsa of Yom-Tov Zahalon, No. 160.

16th-century rabbis from the Ottoman Empire
Rabbis in Ottoman Palestine
Authors of works on the Talmud
Authors of books on Jewish law
1520 births
1590s deaths
Year of birth uncertain
Year of death uncertain